Sukhothai is one of Thailand's seventy-six provinces (changwat) lies in lower northern Thailand. Neighboring provinces are Phrae, Uttaradit, Phitsanulok, Kamphaeng Phet, Tak, and Lampang. Sukhothai can be translated as 'dawn of happiness'.

Toponymy
The modern-day province of Sukhothai was named after the Sukhothai Kingdom that once ruled the area, which in turn borrowed its name from the Sanskrit terms sukha ( 'happiness') + udaya ( 'rise', 'emergence'), meaning 'dawn of happiness'.

Geography

Sukhothai is in the valley of the Yom River in the lower north of Thailand.

The Khao Luang Mountain Range, with its four main peaks: Khao Phu Kha, Khao Phra Mae Ya, Khao Chedi, and Pha Narai, lies within the Ramkhamhaeng National Park in the south of the province. Si Satchanalai National Park is in the northwest, protecting the mountainous forest areas of the Phi Pan Nam Range at the northern end of the province.

The two national parks, along with six other national parks, make up region 14 (Tak) of Thailand's protected areas. 
 Ramkhamhaeng National Park, 
 Si Satchanalai National Park, 

There is one wildlife sanctuary, along with three other wildlife sanctuaries, make up region 14 (Tak) of Thailand's protected areas. 
 Tham Chao Ram Wildlife Sanctuary,

History

Sukhothai was a town founded in the 13th century on the fringe of the Khmer empire. The exact year is unknown, but according to the Fine Arts Office it was between 1238 and 1257. Founded by Phokhun Si Intharathit, it was the first truly independent Thai (Siamese) Kingdom after defeating the Khmers. Sukhothai enjoyed a golden age under their third king, King Ramkhamhaeng, who was credited with creating the Khmer-derived Thai alphabet which is essentially the same as that in use today. He also laid the foundation for politics, the monarchy and religion, as well as expanding its circle of influence. Sukhothai was later ruled by many kings. The province is most known for the historic city of Sukhothai, the capital of the Sukhothai Kingdom. It is about 12 km from the modern New Sukhothai city. Not far from Sukhothai are the Si Satchanalai Historical Park and the Kamphaeng Phet Historical Park. Both were cities in the former Sukhothai kingdom and at the same time period.

Sukhothai Kingdom was merged into Ayutthaya Kingdom in 1438.

The province was at first known as Sawankhalok; it was renamed to Sukhothai in 1939.

Language
The inhabitants of Sukhothai still speak the Sukhothai dialect of Thai, a language that has been spoken since the formation of the Sukhothai Kingdom, some 700 years ago, among themselves. The Sukhothai dialect is distinct from Central Thai in both tone and vocabulary and is thought to be similar to proto-Tai in tone structure, an ancestor to the modern Thai language. The inhabitants of Si Satchanalai and Thung Saliam Districts in the northern part of the province mainly speak Kham Muang (also known as Northern Thai language or Lan Na).

Symbols

The provincial seal shows King Ram Khamhaeng the Great sitting on the Managkhasila Asana throne. Under King Ramkhamhaeng the kingdom of Sukhothai flourished.

The provincial tree is  Afzelia xylocarpa. The provincial flower is the Lotus (Nymphaea lotus).

The provincial slogan is "Source of national heritage and pride, birth place of the Thai alphabet, fireworks of the Loy Krathong festival, preservation of Buddhism, the fine Teen Jok cloth, ancient golden chinaware, holy image of Ramkhamhaeng the Great's mother, the dawn of happiness".

Administrative divisions

Provincial government
The province is divided into nine districts (amphoes). These are further divided into 86 subdistricts (tambons) and 782 villages (mubans).

Mueang Sukhothai
Ban Dan Lan Hoi
Khiri Mat
Kong Krailat
Si Satchanalai
Si Samrong
Sawankhalok
Si Nakhon
Thung Saliam

Local government
As of 26 November 2019 there are: one Sukhothai Provincial Administration Organisation and 21 municipal (thesaban) areas in the province. Sukhothai, Sawankhalok and Si Satchanalai have town (thesaban mueang) status. Further 18 subdistrict municipalities (thesaban tambon). The non-municipal areas are administered by 69 Subdistrict Administrative Organisations - SAO (ongkan borihan suan tambon).

Transport

Roads
There are five highways traversing Sukhothai:

 Highway 12 connects the eastern districts starting at Ban Dan Lan Hoi and passing Muang and Kong Krailat districts to Phitsanulok province.
 Highway 101, starting at Si Satchanalai District, connects the northern districts to the southern districts and passing Sawankhalok, Si Samrong, Muang and Khiri Mat Districts to Kamphaeng Phet province.
 Highway 102 connects Si Satchanalai District to Uttaradit province.
 Highway 1180 connects Sawankhalok District to Si Nakhon District and Uttaradit province.
 Highway 1048 connects Sawankhalok District to Thung Saliam District and Lampang province.

Air
Flights operate daily between Sukhothai and Bangkok.

Rail
The Rail system in Sukhothai is part of the Sawankhalok Line, a branch line which splits from the Chiang Mai Main Line at Ban Dara Junction, Uttaradit and ends at Sawankhalok Station, 30 kilometers from Sukhothai town.

Songthaew 
Songthaews are the most popular form of public transport in the new city and the rural areas. Larger sized Songthaews travel to and from the old and new cities.

Bus
Air-conditioned buses run regularly from Sukhothai Bus Terminal to Bangkok and Chiang Mai, stopping at other major towns on the way. Non air-conditioned buses are for inter-provincial travel to the other districts.

Other
Tuk-tuks and motorbike-taxis are popular for short journeys within the new town.

Tourism 
Sukhothai province is most known for its historical city of Sukhothai, the first capital of Siam, founded by King Ramkhamhaeng. The province's temples and monuments have been well restored and Sukhothai Historical Park is now a UNESCO World Heritage Site. Other interesting places include Ramkhamhaeng National Museum, Ramkhamhaeng National Park, Si Satchanalai Historical Park, Khao Luang National Park and The Royal Palace and Wat Mahathat.

Human achievement index 2017

Since 2003, United Nations Development Programme (UNDP) in Thailand has tracked progress on human development at sub-national level using the Human achievement index (HAI), a composite index covering all the eight key areas of human development. National Economic and Social Development Board (NESDB) has taken over this task since 2017.

Gallery

References

External links 

 Website of the province
 Province page from the Tourist Authority of Thailand

 Sukhothai provincial map, coat of arms and postal stamp

 
Provinces of Thailand